Yevgeny Morozov may refer to:

 Yevgeny Morozov (footballer) (born 2001), Russian footballer
 Yevgeny Morozov (rower) (1929–2021), Soviet rower
 Evgeny Morozov, Belarusian writer
 Yawhen Marozaw, Belarusian footballer
 Evgeniy Morozov (choirmaster), Soviet and Russian choirmaster